Prathers Creek Township is one of seven townships in Alleghany County, North Carolina, United States. The township had a population of 869 according to the 2010 census. Before 1880, it included Cranberry Township.

The township's western border is with Ashe County.

References

Townships in Alleghany County, North Carolina
Townships in North Carolina